Agriculture came to Europe from Asia via the Balkans, which were one of the first areas in Europe to experience the neolithic transformation. As early as 5000 BC the area's Mesolithic population had been transformed into a peasant society of 250,000 people, which in turn grew to 2,000,000 people by the Bronze Age. By then the art of writing had been imported to Greece.

Linear B was used to record accounts, and evident from this was the level of sophistication which most certainly reflected in the population distribution. If 2,000,000 people lived in the Balkans in 1250 BC, 1,000,000 people lived in Greece.

By the time the Dark Ages were underway in Greece in the 7th century BC, so was the population which exploded and carried more than half of its share of the Balkan total and over 2,000,000 people in absolute numbers. By the 5th century, the Greek archipelago contained 3,000,000 people out of 5,000,000 people in the Balkans. Alexander's campaigns opened the whole Orient to Greek settlements, an outlet for the overpopulation back home. As a result, Anatolia (also known as Asia Minor) received the bulk of the Greek expansion. By 200 AD, and after the fruits of Roman peace had settled in, 6,000,000 people in Asia Minor viewed themselves as Greeks of the Roman world, and another 1,000,000 Armenians oscillated between Roman and Persian authority.

For the next 15 centuries Anatolia (Asia Minor) would carry the bulk of the Greek population. 

After the reign of Emperor Heraclius and the loss of all of its overseas territories, Byzantine territories were limited to the Balkans and Anatolia, both largely Greek-populated areas. When Byzantium began to recover after a series of conflicts in the 8th century and its territories stabilized, its population began to recover. By the end of the 8th century there were 7,000,000 Byzantines, a figure that climbed to 12,000,000 Byzantine Greeks by 1025. The numbers began falling steadily to 9,000,000 Byzantines at 1204 and even lower to 5,000,000 Byzantine Greeks at 1281 with the arrival of the Turks.

In 1830, with Greek independence from the Turks, the Greek population numbered only 3,500,000 (one quarter in independent Greece and the majority still under Ottoman rule).

In 1922, after defeat by Turkey and the population exchange which saw 1,250,000 Greeks move across the Aegean (100,000 had departed Eastern Thrace in the decade prior to 1914) the total Greek population was approximately 6,500,000. 250,000 remained in Istanbul. 500-750,000 had been killed during WWI and the Greco-Turkish War of 1922-1923.

Henceforth, the Greek population began to rise steadily in numbers to an all-time high for the peninsula and archipelago of 12,000,000 Greek people in Greece and Cyprus by 2007.

See also
Demographic history of modern Greece

References

Bibliography
 Warren Treadgold, "History of the Byzantine State and Society", 1999
 Mcevedy and Jones, "Atlas of world population history", 1978

History of modern Greece
Society of Greece
Greece
Demographics of Greece